Al Sakhama is a village in Qatar, located in the municipality of Al Daayen. It is situated near the border with Umm Salal Municipality.

Etymology
In Qatari Arabic dialect, the word "sakhama" translates to "coal". It received this name due to the coal mining operations that were historically based in the village.

History
In J.G. Lorimer's Gazetteer of the Persian Gulf, Al Sakhama is reported as a town 5 miles west of Lusail typified by a 4-acre garden containing approximately 300 date palms in 1908. The garden, which was said to have been established by Jassim bin Mohammed Al Thani, is described as being enclosed by a mud wall and surrounded on all sides by rows of tamarix trees. It was irrigated by eight large masonry wells, each of which were worked by a pair of donkeys. Additionally, it had a rest quarters for the gardeners and a tower which served as a rest place for Jassim bin Mohammed. Lorimer noted that it appeared to be one of the only seven sizable date palm plantations in Qatar.

After Jassim bin Mohammed's departure, ownership of the village was transferred to Jassim bin Sultan Al Thani, who planted several additional palm trees in the area. Although the village was typified by a rawda (or depression) where small amounts of water would collect, and also had masonry wells constructed in its vicinity, the water was high in salinity; thus the vegetation could not be sustained without costly irrigation mechanisms. This caused many inhabitants to abandon the village in the early-to-mid 20th century.

Education
The following school is located in Al Sakhama:

References

Populated places in Al Daayen